Cross-Currents: East Asian History and Culture Review is a peer-reviewed open access scholarly journal on East Asian history and culture. It is a joint enterprise of the Research Institute of Korean Studies (RIKS) at Korea University and the Institute of East Asian Studies (IEAS) at the University of California, Berkeley. The current editors-in-chief are Hyongchan Kim and Wen-hsin Yeh.

References

External links 
 

Open access journals
Publications established in 2011
English-language journals
East Asian studies journals